Chen Guang (Chinese: 陈光; born 3 February 1995 in Jilin) is a Chinese male short track speed skater.

References

External links
 

1995 births
Living people
Chinese male short track speed skaters
Universiade medalists in short track speed skating
Universiade gold medalists for China
Universiade bronze medalists for China
Competitors at the 2015 Winter Universiade
Competitors at the 2017 Winter Universiade
21st-century Chinese people